Charles Holmes (1868–1936) was a British painter, art critic and museum director.

Charles Holmes may also refer to:

 Charles Holmes (Royal Navy officer) (1711–1761), British naval officer and MP, Wolfe's third-in-command during the capture of Quebec in 1759
 Charles H. Holmes (1827–1874), member of the U.S. House of Representatives from New York
 Charlie Holmes (1910–1985), saxophonist
 Charlie Holmes (footballer) (1910–1981), Australian footballer for Fitzroy
 Charlie Holmes, frontman of English rock band Heart in Hand
 Chuck Holmes (entrepreneur) (1945–2000), American entrepreneur and philanthropist, founded Falcon Studios
 Chuck Holmes (ice hockey) (1934–2019), ice hockey player